The Vanguard-class ships of the line were a class of two-deck 80-gun second rates, designed for the Royal Navy by Sir William Symonds, of which nine were completed as sailing ships of the line, although another two of these were completed as (and others converted into) steam warships.

They were originally planned as 78-gun third rates. Two ships were ordered in 1832 and another two in 1833, although one of the latter was intended to be a rebuilding of the second rate Union, and this was subsequently cancelled. At this point the design was modified and they were re-designated as 80-gun second rates. Another ship was ordered to this design in 1838, another seven in 1839 (of which two were subsequently re-ordered three months later as 90-gun ships to a new design - the Albion and Aboukir) and another two in 1840. Two of the above ships were re-ordered and completed as steam battleships - Majestic and Irresistible. A final ship to this design, the Brunswick, was ordered in 1844 but in 1847 she was re-ordered to a modified design.

Ships

Builder: Pembroke Dockyard
Ordered: 23 June 1832
Launched: 25 August 1835
Fate: Broken up, 1875

Builder: Pembroke Dockyard
Ordered: 23 June 1832
Launched: 17 August 1841
Fate: Sold, 1867

Builder: Chatham Dockyard
Ordered: 7 October 1833
Launched: 25 July 1842
Fate: Burnt, 1875

Builder: Pembroke Dockyard
Ordered: 15 June 1838
Launched: 6 September 1842
Fate: Broken up, 1869

Builder: Bombay Dockyard
Ordered: 12 March 1839 (as Madras)
Launched: 11 November 1848
Fate: Broken up, 1906

Builder: Pembroke Dockyard
Ordered: 18 March 1839
Launched: 2 May 1844
Fate: Sold, 1870

Builder: Pembroke Dockyard
Ordered: 12 March 1840
Launched: 29 July 1847
Fate: Sold, 1905

Builder: Pembroke Dockyard
Ordered: 18 March 1839
Launched: 1 June 1848
Fate: Sold, 1867

Builder: Chatham Dockyard
Ordered: 18 March 1839
Launched: 1 July 1848
Fate: Sold, 1929

References

Lavery, Brian (2003) The Ship of the Line - Volume 1: The development of the battlefleet 1650-1850. Conway Maritime Press. .
Lyon, David and Winfield, Rif (2004) The Sail and Steam Navy List 1815-1889. Chatham Publishing. .

External links

 
Ship of the line classes